The 2014 United States Senate election in Wyoming took place on November 4, 2014, to elect a member of the United States Senate for the State of Wyoming. Incumbent Republican senator Mike Enzi won re-election to a fourth term in office. Enzi held Democratic nominee Charlie Hardy to just 17.4 percent of the vote – the lowest percentage of the vote for any major party nominee in Wyoming U.S. Senate electoral history out of the 39 races conducted during the direct election era.

Republican primary 
No incumbent Wyoming Republican senator running for re-election in the direct vote era has failed to win their party's nomination.

Candidates

Declared 
 Thomas Bleming, former mercenary and candidate for the U.S. Senate in 2012
 Arthur Bruce Clifton, oil company worker
 Mike Enzi, incumbent senator
 James "Coaltrain" Gregory
 Bryan E. Miller, retired air force officer and energy consultant

Withdrew 
 Liz Cheney, attorney, political commentator and daughter of Dick Cheney

Endorsements

Polling 

 ^ Internal poll for the Mike Enzi campaign

Results

Democratic primary

Candidates

Declared 
 William Bryk, attorney from New York and perennial candidate
 Charlie Hardy, retired priest and candidate for Congress in 2012
 Al Hamburg, retired house painter, veteran and perennial candidate
 Rex Wilde, contracting company employee and candidate for governor in 2010

Declined 
 Gary Trauner, businessman and nominee for Wyoming's at-large congressional district in 2006 and 2008

Results

Independents and Third Parties

Candidates

Declared 
 Curt Gottshall (Independent), commercial airline pilot
 Joseph Porambo (Libertarian), cook at an assisted living home

General election

Predictions

Polling 

With Enzi

With Cheney

Results

See also 

 2014 United States Senate elections
 2014 Wyoming gubernatorial election
 2014 United States elections
 2014 United States House of Representatives election in Wyoming

References

External links 
 U.S. Senate elections in Wyoming, 2014 at Ballotpedia
 Campaign contributions at OpenSecrets
 Wyoming U.S. Senate debate excerpts, OnTheIssues.org

 Official campaign websites (Archived)
 Mike Enzi for U.S. Senate
 Curt Gottshall for U.S. Senate
 Bryan Miller for U.S. Senate
 Charlie Hardy for U.S. Senate

2014
Wyoming
United States Senate